Parrot cichlid may refer to:
Hoplarchus psittacus, a South American cichlid
Hypsophrys nicaraguensis, a Central American cichlid
 Blood parrot cichlid, a hybrid cichlid created in Asia

See also
 Parrotfish, a group of marine species